The 1982 World Shooting Championships was the 43rd edition of the global shooting competition World Shooting Championships, organised by the International Shooting Sport Federation.

Results men

Rifle

Standard rifle

Air rifle

Pistol

Rapid fire pistol

Center fire pistol

Standard pistol

Air pistol

Running target

Trap

Skeet

Results women

Medal table

See also
Trap World Champions

References

External links

ISSF World Shooting Championships
1982 in shooting sports